Chersodoma is a genus of South American flowering plants in the daisy family. Members of this genus or dioecious shrubs or subshrubs.

 Species

References 

Senecioneae
Asteraceae genera
Flora of South America
Taxa named by Rodolfo Amando Philippi
Dioecious plants